General Guido Hernán Vildoso Calderón (born 5 April 1937, La Paz, Bolivia) is a former Bolivian military officer who served as the de facto 59th president of Bolivia in 1982. He was Bolivia's final de facto president.

Biography
Born in La Paz on 5 April 1937, Vildoso joined the Bolivian armed forces and took specialized courses in Brazil, Panama, and the United States. In the 1970s he served in the cabinet of military dictator Hugo Banzer. Vildoso was second in command in the Bolivian Army when, in July 1982, he was entrusted by his peers with the task of extricating the military from power and returning the country to constitutional, democratic rule after a period of several dictatorships. His appointment followed the highly unpopular 1980-82 dictatorships of Luis García Meza and Celso Torrelio.

Presidency (1982)

Vildoso became president of Bolivia on 21 July 1982. Faced with a grave social, economic and fiscal crisis, Vildoso accelerated the re-democratization process. He and his fellow commanders essentially had two options: call new elections, or to reconvene the 1980 Congress and respect the results of that year's presidential contest. When it became apparent that the country would crumble into civil war before new elections could be held, Vildoso's junta recalled the 1980 Congress and promised to accept its choice of president. Congress reconvened on 23 September, and its virtual first act was to reconfirm the 1980 election results, which showed former president Hernán Siles Zuazo well ahead, though short of a majority. On 5 October, Congress overwhelmingly elected Siles as president.

Vildoso returned the presidential emblems to Congress on October 10, 1982, thus closing the door on military control of Bolivia. This gesture allowed Siles to formally take office later that day. Nonetheless, Vildoso and his cabinet were loudly booed by the population present at the transfer of power to Siles. The Bolivian Congress did later acknowledge Vildoso for his two main accomplishments: restoring democracy to Bolivia with no bloodshed and developing the fundamentals of the economic plan, 21060, that was later used by President Víctor Paz Estenssoro to restore sound macroeconomic variables to the nation.

Post-presidency (1982–present)
After the handover of authority, Vildoso retired from the military and currently lives in Cochabamba. He is reportedly highly regarded by Bolivian citizens.  To date, he is the last non-constitutional ruler of the country.

See also 
 Cabinet of Guido Vildoso

References
Prado Salmón, Gral. Gary. "Poder y Fuerzas Armadas, 1949-1982."

1937 births
Living people
20th-century Bolivian politicians
Bolivian generals
Government ministers of Bolivia
Health ministers of Bolivia
Military College of the Army alumni
People from La Paz
Presidents of Bolivia